Tom Nemeth (born January 16, 1971) is a Canadian retired professional ice hockey defenceman. He was selected by the Minnesota North Stars in the 10th round (206th overall) of the 1991 NHL Entry Draft.

Prior to turning professional, Nemeth played major junior hockey with the Cornwall Royals in the Ontario Hockey League. He went on to play 12 seasons of professional hockey, including parts of 11 seasons in the ECHL, where he was selected three times as the ECHL Defenceman of the Year. In 2003, Nemeth was named to the ECHL 15th Anniversary First Team, and in 2009 Nemeth was inducted into the ECHL Hall of Fame.

Records
During the 1993–94 regular season, Nemeth registered 16 goals and 82 assists to set the ECHL record for most assists (82) and most points (98) by a defenceman.

On April 3, 1997, Nemeth, then of the Dayton Bombers, and Andrew Shier and Scott Burfoot of the Richmond Renegades, each scored a goal within 37 seconds to set the ECHL record for the fastest three playoff goals by two teams.

Career statistics

Awards and honours

References

External links

1971 births
Living people
Canadian ice hockey defencemen
Cincinnati Cyclones (IHL) players
Columbus Stars players
Cornwall Royals (OHL) players
Dayton Bombers players
Fort Wayne Komets players
Ice hockey people from Ontario
Kalamazoo Wings (1974–2000) players
Minnesota North Stars draft picks
Rochester Americans players
South Carolina Stingrays players
Sportspeople from St. Catharines
Toledo Storm players
Buffalo Stampede players